Flight Squad (Air Academy in French) is an  animated television series produced by the CINAR Corporation (now WildBrain), Antéfilms Productions, and Neurones Animation. The show has 26 episodes were produced.

Plot
A team of daredevil pilots form the Flight Squad. With their own airplane fleet that is a high-yielding as it is varied, Flight Squad is organized as an independent air services company, carrying out "à la carte" missions for their clients.

Characters
Dan, an ex-fighter pilot and former member of the Canadian secret service.
Tina, an assistant woman.
Alex
Jeff, brother of Emma.
Emma, sister of Jeff
Jeff's teenage friends.
Max, indispensable.
Parachute the Flying Squirrel, the team's pet.

Enemies
Kordac, benefactor of Barracudas.
Bill, leader of Barracudas.
Buck, Bill's second in command and member of Barracudas.
Boris, member of Barracudas and the more baddest of them.

Voice cast 

 Al Goulem
 Ricky Mabe
 Thor Bishopric
 A.J. Henderson
 Patricia Rodriguez 
 Richard Dumont
 Holly Gauthier-Frankel 
 Mark Camacho
 Arthur Holden

Episodes

Broadcast

The show ran on Teletoon in Canada. Internationally, The show is aired on M6 in France and Telefutura (Spanish) and This TV in the United States.

DVD releases
Two volumes of the series, each containing three episodes, were released on DVD in 2005.

References

External links 
 

Teletoon original programming
2000s Canadian animated television series
2000 Canadian television series debuts
2000 Canadian television series endings
2000s French animated television series
2000 French television series debuts
2000 French television series endings
Australian Broadcasting Corporation original programming
Canadian children's animated action television series
Canadian children's animated adventure television series
Canadian children's animated fantasy television series
French children's animated action television series
French children's animated adventure television series
French children's animated fantasy television series
Television series by Cookie Jar Entertainment
Aviation television series
English-language television shows
Television series by DHX Media